Texas's 12th congressional district in the United States House of Representatives is in the north portion of the state of Texas. As of 2017, the 12th district contained 806,551 people and had a median income of $67,703. It consists of the western half of Tarrant County, as well as most of Parker County. The district also contains Texas Christian University. Fragments of the Dallas–Fort Worth metroplex are included in the district. The district is currently represented by Republican Kay Granger, who was first elected in 1996.

Election results from presidential races

List of members representing the district

Election results

General election

Historical district boundaries

See also
List of United States congressional districts

References

 Congressional Biographical Directory of the United States 1774–present

12